Max de Boom (born 17 February 1996) is a Dutch professional footballer who plays as a winger for VV Pelikaan-S.

Club career
De Boom came through the SC Heerenveen youth system and joined PEC Zwolle in 2014. He made his Eredivisie debut against Willem II in the 2014/15 season. However, after being released, De Boom went down to the Dutch second division with Helmond Sport in 2017 and to the amateur leagues later that year.

References

1996 births
Living people
Dutch footballers
PEC Zwolle players
Helmond Sport players
Eredivisie players
Eerste Divisie players
Association football forwards
Footballers from Utrecht (city)